Mount Burnham is a mountain,  high, standing  north of Mount Van Valkenburg in the Clark Mountains, in the Ford Ranges of Marie Byrd Land. It was discovered on aerial flights from West Base of the U.S. Antarctic Service in 1940 and named for Guy Burnham, Cartographer in the School of Geography of Clark University.

References
 

Mountains of Marie Byrd Land